Miller Field  is a public airport a mile south of Valentine in Cherry County, Nebraska.

Facilities
It has two runways: 14/32 is 4,700 by 75 feet (1,433 x 23 m) concrete and 3/21 is 3,700 by 60 feet asphalt. In the year ending June 27, 2006 the airport had 4,264 aircraft operations, average 11 per day: 86% general aviation, 14% air taxi and <1% military.

For a year or two starting in 1959 it had airline flights-- Frontier DC-3s.

References

External links 
 

Airports in Nebraska
Buildings and structures in Cherry County, Nebraska